The Sap is a 1926 American comedy film directed by Erle C. Kenton and written by Edward T. Lowe Jr. It is based on the 1924 play The Sap by William A. Grew. The film stars Kenneth Harlan, Heinie Conklin, Mary McAllister, David Butler, Eulalie Jensen and John Cossar. The film was released by Warner Bros. on March 20, 1926.

Plot
The titular sap is Barry Weston, a coward who goes off to war unexpectedly fights heroically and is welcomed back to his hometown.

Cast      
Kenneth Harlan as Barry Weston, a coward forced into war who comes home a hero
Heinie Conklin as Wienie Duke
Mary McAllister as Janet
David Butler as Vance
Eulalie Jensen as Mrs. Weston, Barry's mother
John Cossar as Janet's Father

References

External links
 

1926 films
1920s English-language films
Silent American comedy films
1926 comedy films
Warner Bros. films
Films directed by Erle C. Kenton
American silent feature films
American black-and-white films
1920s American films